Thomas William Lancaster, M.A. (1787–1869) was an English churchman and academic, vicar of Banbury and fellow of Queen's College, Oxford.

Life
He was born at Fulham, Middlesex, on 24 August 1787, was son of the Rev. Thomas Lancaster of Wimbledon, Surrey.
He was matriculated at Oriel College, Oxford, 26 January 1804, and graduated B. A. (with a second class in lit. hum.) in 1807, and M.A. in 1810.
In 1808, he was elected to a Michel scholarship at Queen's College, and in the following year to a fellowship on the same foundation.

After being ordained deacon in 1810 and priest in 1812, he became in the latter year curate of Banbury in Oxfordshire, and vicar of Banbury in 1815.
He resigned his fellowship at Queen's on his marriage in 1816.

His relations with his parishioners were not happy, and although he retained the living of Banbury for upwards of thirty-three years, he resided in Oxford about half that time.
In 1849, the new bishop of Oxford, Samuel Wilberforce, induced him to exchange Banbury for the rectory of Over Worton, a small village near Woodstock.
He did not find the new living more congenial than the old, and continued to reside in Oxford, where he frequented the Bodleian Library, and was respected for his learning.

In 1831, he preached the Bampton Lectures, taking for his subject "The Popular Evidence of Christianity."
He was appointed a select preacher to the university in 1832, and a public examiner in 1832-3. From 1840 to 1849, he acted, with little success, as under-master (ostiarius, or usher) of Magdalen College school, and was for a time chaplain to the Dowager Countess of Guilford.

He was found dead in his bed at his lodgings in High Street, 12 December 1859, and was buried in the Holywell cemetery.

Family
His wife, Miss Anne Walford of Banbury, died 8 February 1860, at the age of eighty-four.
He had no family.

Works
The popular evidence of Christianity: stated and examined. 1831,

References

Attribution

1787 births
1869 deaths
Fellows of The Queen's College, Oxford
19th-century English Anglican priests